The 1982–83 Duke Blue Devils men's basketball team represented Duke University. The head coach was Mike Krzyzewski and the team finished the season with an overall record of 11–17 and did not qualify for the NCAA tournament.

Schedule 

|-
!colspan=9 style=| Regular season

|-
!colspan=12 style=| ACC Tournament

References

External links 
 Season schedule at Sports Reference
 

Duke Blue Devils men's basketball seasons
Duke
1982 in sports in North Carolina
1983 in sports in North Carolina